The 2018 Victorian state election was held on Saturday, 24 November 2018 to elect the 59th Parliament of Victoria. All 88 seats in the Legislative Assembly (lower house) and all 40 seats in the Legislative Council (upper house) were up for election. The first-term incumbent Labor government, led by Premier Daniel Andrews, won a second four-year term, defeating the Liberal/National Coalition opposition, led by Opposition Leader Matthew Guy in a landslide victory. Minor party the Greens led by Samantha Ratnam also contested the election.

Labor won 55 seats in the 88-seat Legislative Assembly, an increase of eight seats from the previous election in 2014, and a majority of 22 seats. This was the fifth time that a Labor government was re-elected in Victoria, and it tied Victorian Labor's second-best showing at the state level. The Coalition suffered an 11-seat swing against it, and won 27 seats. The Greens won 3 seats, a net increase of 1 seat since the last election though equal to the share of seats they held when the election was called. The remaining three seats on the crossbench were won by independents. In the Legislative Council, Labor won 18 seats, three short of a majority. The Coalition won 11 seats and the remaining 11 seats were won by a range of minor parties from across the political spectrum.

Several days after Labor's victory, the Second Andrews Ministry was sworn in by the Governor and was notable for featuring an equal number of men and women. The following week the Liberal Party elected Michael O'Brien leader of the party, who became Opposition Leader in the new parliament, after Guy had announced earlier he would stand down from the position.

For the election, Victoria had compulsory voting and used majoritarian preferential voting in single-member seats for the Legislative Assembly, and Single transferable vote (STV) in multi-member seats for the proportionally represented Legislative Council. The Legislative Council had 40 members serving four-year terms, elected from eight electoral regions each with five members. With each region electing 5 members, the quota in each region for election, after distribution of preferences, was 16.7% (one-sixth) of the valid votes cast in that district. The election was conducted by the Victorian Electoral Commission (VEC), an independent body answerable to parliament.

Key dates
Pursuant to the Electoral Act 2002, Victoria has had fixed terms, with all elections since the 2006 election held every four years on the last Saturday of November. The incumbent government entered into caretaker mode at 6:00 pm on Tuesday, 30 October 2018, when writs were officially issued.

Key dates for the election are:
30 October: Writs issued by the Governor of Victoria
31 October: Opening of nominations for all candidates
6 November: Close of electoral roll
8 November: Close of nominations for party candidates
9 November: Close of nominations for independent candidates
12 November: Early voting begins
24 November: Election day (polls open 8am to 6pm)
30 November: Last day for receipt of postal votes
15 December: Last day for return of writs.

Previous parliament

Legislative Assembly 
Following the 2014 election, Labor formed majority government with 47 seats. The Coalition held 38 seats, with the Liberal Party holding 30 and the National Party holding 8. On the crossbench, the Greens held 2 seats and Independent Suzanna Sheed held the seat of Shepparton.

Legislative Council 
Following the 2014 election, Labor held 14 seats; the Coalition held 16 seats (14 Liberal, 2 National); the Greens held 5 seats; the Shooters, Fishers and Farmers Party held 2 seats; and the Sex Party (now the Reason Party), Democratic Labour Party, and Vote 1 Local Jobs party held 1 seat each.

By-elections 
Former Nationals leader Peter Ryan announced his resignation from parliament on 2 February 2015, triggering a by-election in the seat of Gippsland South for 14 March. The election was won by Danny O'Brien of the National Party.

Denis Napthine and Terry Mulder resigned from parliament on 3 September 2015. Their seats were retained by the Liberal Party in by-elections held in South-West Coast and Polwarth on 31 October.

Minister for Women and Minister for the Prevention of Family Violence Fiona Richardson died on 23 August 2017. A by-election was held in the seat of Northcote on 18 November, in which the Victorian Greens won the seat from the Labor Party.

Changes in parliament 
Don Nardella, the former Deputy Speaker of the Assembly and member for the seat of Melton, resigned from the Labor Party on 7 March 2017 to sit as an independent. Nardella's resignation was demanded by Premier Andrews after Nardella refused to pay back approximately $100,000 of taxpayer funded entitlements in the midst an expenses scandal. The resignation reduced the number of Labor members in the Assembly from 47 to 46, still above the 45 seats needed for majority government to be formed. Nardella had previously announced his intention to quit politics at the 2018 election and following his resignation from the Labor Party stated he intended to serve out his full term as the member for Melton.

Russell Northe, the member for Morwell resigned from the National Party on 28 August 2017, due to mental health and financial issues, continuing in his position as an independent.

Greg Barber resigned as Leader of the Greens and from his Northern Metropolitan Region seat on 28 September 2017, and was replaced in both by Moreland councillor Samantha Ratnam.

Colleen Hartland, a Greens member of the Western Metropolitan Region, resigned on 8 February 2018, and was replaced by Huong Truong.

State of electorates

The following Mackerras pendulum lists seats in the Legislative Assembly according to the percentage point margin on a two candidate preferred basis based on the 2014 election results. The Australian Electoral Commission considers a seat "safe" if it requires a swing of over 10% to change, "fairly safe" seats require a swing of between 6 and 10%, while "marginal" seats require a swing of less than 6%.

Registered parties
At the close of nominations, there were 23 parties registered with the Victorian Electoral Commission (VEC), of which 21 contested the election:

 Animal Justice Party
 Australian Conservatives (did not contest)
 Aussie Battler Party
 Australian Country Party/Give It Back
 Australian Greens
 Australian Labor Party
 Australian Liberty Alliance
 Democratic Labour Party
 Derryn Hinch's Justice Party
 Health Australia Party
 Hudson for Northern Victoria
 Liberal Democratic Party
 Liberal Party
 National Party
 Pauline Hanson's One Nation (did not contest)
 Reason Party
 Shooters and Fishers Party
 Transport Matters Party
 Socialist Alliance (contested as part of Victorian Socialists electoral alliance)
 Sustainable Australia
 Victorian Socialists
 Voluntary Euthanasia Party
 Vote 1 Local Jobs

Candidates and retiring MPs 

Nominations of candidates opened on 31 October 2018. Nominations for party candidates closed on 8 November, and for independent candidates on 9 November.

A total of 887 candidates nominated for the election, down from 896 at the 2014 election. There were 507 candidates for the Legislative Assembly, the second-highest number on record, down from 545 in 2014. The 380 candidates for the Legislative Council was the highest number of upper house candidates in a Victorian election, up from 351 in 2014.

Retiring MPs
Members who chose not to renominate are as follows:

Labor
 Judith Graley MLA (Narre Warren South) – announced 19 August 2017
 Geoff Howard MLA (Buninyong) – announced 15 September 2017
 Sharon Knight MLA (Wendouree) – announced 31 July 2017
 Telmo Languiller MLA (Tarneit) – announced 26 August 2017
 Hong Lim MLA (Clarinda) – announced 5 September 2017
 Wade Noonan MLA (Williamstown) – announced 4 October 2017
 Jude Perera MLA (Cranbourne) – announced 15 September 2017
 Marsha Thomson MLA (Footscray) – announced 21 September 2017
 Khalil Eideh MLC (Western Metropolitan Region) – announced 21 September 2017
 Daniel Mulino MLC (Eastern Victoria Region) – retiring to run for federal House of Representatives

Liberal
 Louise Asher MLA (Brighton) – announced 11 August 2016
 Martin Dixon MLA (Nepean) – announced 10 August 2016
 Christine Fyffe MLA (Evelyn) – announced 21 October 2016
Murray Thompson MLA (Sandringham) – announced 24 November 2016
Richard Dalla-Riva MLC (Eastern Metropolitan Region) – announced 10 February 2017
Simon Ramsay MLC (Western Victoria Region) – announced 24 July 2018

Independent
Don Nardella MLA (Melton) – announced 28 February 2017

Disendorsed candidates 
On 13 November, Neelam Rai, a Liberal candidate for Northern Metropolitan Region, withdrew her candidacy after the Herald Sun revealed that she was the director of an unregistered charity, No Hunger Australia. The Liberal Party also released a statement saying that Rai's nomination form for preselection had "failed to disclose a number of issues of relevance".

On 15 November, the Liberal Party withdrew its endorsement of Meralyn Klein, their candidate for the marginal seat of Yan Yean, after footage emerged of her speaking in an anti-Muslim video produced by the Australian Liberty Alliance. Klein denied any association with the ALA, saying she had been interviewed about an incident where she had been assaulted several years earlier, and the footage had been provided to the ALA and edited into an anti-Muslim video.

As ballot papers had already been printed, both Rai and Klein appeared as Liberal candidates. The Labor Party petitioned the Supreme Court to order the VEC to reprint the ballot papers with Klein's affiliation removed, but the case was dismissed.

On 22 November, two days before Election Day, the Greens ordered a then-unnamed candidate to withdraw from the campaign after an allegation of "serious sexual misconduct" was made. The following day the party revealed the candidate in question was Dominic Phillips, candidate for the seat of Sandringham; he was stood down by the party. As the ballot papers had already been printed, Phillips stood as the Greens candidate and won over 8% of the vote.

Issues 
On 28 October both Labor and the Coalition launched their campaigns, with Labor making health, paramedics and improved ambulance response times a priority, while the Coalition focused on cutting taxes, better managing population growth and cracking down on crime. Labor and the Coalition pledged $23.3 billion and $24.8 billion respectively, more than double pledged during the 2010 and 2014 elections, excluding the proposed Suburban Rail Loop and high speed rail for regional services which would require future governments to fund. Labor pledged to invest substantially more money than the Coalition in health, with $1.3bn in promises to boost nursing numbers and $395.8m to provide every state school student with free dental check-ups and procedures and $232m to build seven new early parenting centres; in contrast to the Coalition whose signature health policy was constructing a new hospital in Warragul, the biggest city in the rapidly expanding West Gippsland region.

The Coalition's leading message of the campaign was to "get back in control" of the state's allegedly burgeoning crime problem. The party promised tougher bail conditions than Labor, saying that anyone who breaches bail will be jailed. In addition mandatory sentencing would become more commonplace, with minimum sentences for repeat violent offenders and people deemed possible terror threats could be forced to wear electronic monitoring devices, a proposal made after the stabbing attack in the city which occurred during the campaign. The divisions between the parties over social issues were pronounced, as the Coalition promised to axe the safe injecting room in Richmond, the Safe Schools program for LGBTI children in state secondary schools and the process for a formalised treaty for Indigenous Victorians. The Coalition also promised to reinstate religious instruction classes in state schools, something removed from classes and made an opt-in process by Labor.

Arguably the most pressing issue of the campaign was public transport and infrastructure. Melbourne's record population growth of more than 125,000 people a year made both party leaders focus on big transport initiatives. Labor unveiled a $50 billion underground rail loop of the suburbs surrounding the city, though admitted the project would not be completed before 2050 and actually pledged $300 million for a business study. The Coalition instead proposed a $19 billion "European-style" regional rail network that would rebuild the entire network and include high-speed rail on four lines, travelling up to 200 km an hour. Both parties agreed on the West Gate Tunnel, North East Link and Metro Rail projects, though the Coalition pledged to bring back the defunct East West Link project which was scrapped at a cost of $1 billion by the Labor Government.

Minor party the Greens sought to expand their numbers in parliament and make further gains in inner-city/suburban seats held by Labor such as Albert Park, Brunswick and Richmond. The party proposed a dedicated bike "superlane" stretching 17 kilometres from Elsternwick railway station to Coburg, as well as further cycling routes connecting Box Hill and Richmond, Ringwood and Croydon and a connection from the Burwood Highway through to Knox and Deakin University. Overall, most Greens policies were more closely aligned with Labor policies than the Coalition, a fact acknowledged by Greens leader Samantha Ratnam who said she would seek to negotiate with Labor to form government in the event of a hung parliament. Labor leader Daniel Andrews reacted negatively to this possibility saying "no deal will be offered" and criticising the Greens for allegedly "refusing to call out denigration of women", in reference to past sexist comments made by the Greens candidate for the seat of Footscray, Angus McAlpine.

The total number of people who voted early in the last two weeks of the campaign was 1,639,202, which made up 40% of the eligible voting population.

Polling

Graphical summary

Voting intention
Polling that is conducted by Newspoll and published in The Australian is conducted via random telephone number selection in city and country areas. Sampling sizes usually consist of over 1200 electors. The declared margin of error is ±2.8 percentage points.

In the lead-up to the election, Poll aggregation site Poll Bludger placed the two-party-preferred vote for Labor at 53.5%, coupled with primary vote shares at 41.0% for Labor, 39.8% for the Liberal/National Coalition, and 11.1% for the Greens. Election Analyst Antony Green stated on the ABC's election coverage that the result was "four to five percent better than all the opinion polls, which is the most out I've seen opinion polls in this country"

The Liberal Party wrote in their campaign review that their data gathered in their internal research in marginal seats was "fundamentally wrong", which lead to resources and campaigners being diverted from marginal Liberal-held seats to "target "Labor" seats on the false assumption that "[the Liberal Party] had already won [Liberal held] seats".

Preferred Premier and satisfaction

Newspaper endorsements

Results

Legislative Assembly

* Compared with results at 2014 election. The Greens went into the 2018 election with 3 seats following the Northcote by-election, 2017** Compared with results at 2014 election. There were 3 independent members at the dissolution of parliament following resignations by Russell Northe and Don Nardella.*** Based on the 87 districts for which the Liberal/National Coalition fielded a candidate. The Liberal Party did not field a candidate in Richmond. Labor received 73.07% of the two-party-preferred vote in that district at the 2014 election.

Labor's victory came primarily on the strength of a larger-than-expected and larger than statewide swing in eastern Melbourne, which has traditionally decided elections in Victoria. According to the ABC's election analyst Antony Green, the eastern suburbs were swept up in a "band of red". They also took a number of seats in areas considered Liberal heartland. Hawthorn, for instance, fell to Labor for only the second time ever and for the first time in 63 years. Bass elected a Labor member for the first time ever; the seat and its predecessors, Gippsland West and Westernport, had been in conservative hands for all but two terms since 1909.

Legislative Council

* - Compared with results at 2014 election. The DLP went into the 2018 election with no Legislative Council seats after Rachel Carling-Jenkins initially defected to the Conservatives and eventually sat as an independent. ** - Compared with results at 2014 election. There was one independent at the dissolution of parliament after Rachel Carling-Jenkin's defections from the DLP and then the Conservatives.

Legislative Council seats table

Party key:

Labor benefited from an enormous swing toward it and consequently picked up at least one seat in most regions, winning 18 seats. The swing against the Coalition in the lower house was replicated in the Council and they lost five seats to finish with only 11. Most of the minor parties were the beneficiaries of above-the-line voting, though Reason Party MP Fiona Patten was re-elected on the back of a strong below-the-line vote in Northern Metropolitan. The Greens were the biggest losers of the system, losing four of their five upper house members and only re-electing party leader Samantha Ratnam. Derryn Hinch's Justice Party was the biggest winner on the crossbench, picking up three seats, however the party's member for Western Metropolitan (Catherine Cumming) defected to sit as an independent prior to being sworn in. The Liberal Democrats won two seats.

Richard Willingham, the ABC News state political correspondent, described the result as proof of Labor's continued "dominance" of state politics, noting that "enough progressive parties [won] spots on the crossbench to potentially provide an avenue for any controversial legislation."

References

External links
2018 State election (Victorian Electoral Commission)
2018 Victoria Election (ABC Elections)

 
Elections in Victoria (Australia)
2018 elections in Australia
2010s in Victoria (Australia)
November 2018 events in Australia
Landslide victories